Andreas Fontana is a Swiss film director and writer. He is best known for his debut feature film Azor.

Life and career
Fontana was born in Geneva. He completed his MA in Comparative Literature at the University of Geneva. In 2009, he directed his first short film Cotonov Vanished, won the First Steps prize at the 2010 Visions du Réel in Nyon. Later in 2010, he graduated with a MA in film production at the ECAL in Lausanne and HEAD in Geneva.

Fontana's debut feature film Azor, starring Fabrizio Rongione, Stephanie Cléau and Elli Medeiros, premiered worldwide at the 71st Berlin International Film Festival. He also won the Emerging Swiss Talent Award at the Zurich Film Festival in 2021.

Selected filmography

Awards and nominations

References

External links
 

1982 births
Living people
Swiss film directors
Swiss screenwriters
Male screenwriters
Film people from Geneva